Czepino  (German Wintersfelde) is a village in the administrative district of Gmina Gryfino, within Gryfino County, West Pomeranian Voivodeship, in north-western Poland, close to the German border.

The village has a population of 412.

See also
History of Pomerania

References

Czepino